Hoseyn Ali Kandi or Hoseynali Kandi may refer to:
 Hoseyn Ali Kandi-ye Ajam
 Hoseyn Ali Kandi-ye Kord